Ben M. Baglio (born 1960 in New York City, U.S.) is an American author who created the brief for two series of children's books – Dolphin Diaries and Animal Ark. Dolphin Diaries features a girl and her family from Florida, who travel around the world as marine biologists and study dolphins. Animal Ark features Mandy Hope, whose parents are vets; she helps injured animals and solves animal-related mysteries. The books were written by commissioned writers in the Canada under Baglio's instruction and published using the pseudonym Lucy Daniels in the UK. Each author is named with a 'Special Thanks' on the copyright page – see Dolphin in the Deep copyright page for an example. In the U.S., the books are published under the name of Ben M. Baglio so this name is effectively both a man born in 1960 and also the collective pseudonym for the group of writers who write the books.

Using his pen name he also wrote the book series The Pet Finders Club, featuring a group of three children who search for people's lost pets.

Dolphin Diaries
In Dolphin Diaries, a girl named Jody McGrath discovers and befriends a friendly bottlenose dolphin whom she names Apollo. He is a lone dolphin and Jody united him to his "new" pod, and follows her for a while through the series. As the story proceeds, she meets others along the way. She befriends many new people and dolphins.

Other characters in Dolphin Diaries are Brittany Pierce, Captain Pierce, Cameron Tucker, the tutor Maddie, her twin brothers Sean and Jimmy, her mother Gina who is Italian, and her father Craig who is Irish.

List of books
Into the Blue (written by Ben M. Baglio)
Touching the waves (written by Ben M. Baglio)
Riding the Storm (written by Ben M. Baglio)
Under the Stars (written by Ben M. Baglio)
Chasing the Dream (written by Ben M. Baglio)
Racing the Wind (written by Ben M. Baglio)
Following the Rainbow (written by Ben M. Baglio)
Dancing the Seas (written by Ben M. Baglio)
Leaving the Shallows (written by Ben M. Baglio)
Beyond The Sunrise (written by Ben M. Baglio)

The Pet Finders Club
In The Pet Finders Club, a girl named Andie Talbot has moved to Radcliffe, Greater Manchester, England, from Texas, USA. She has a Jack Russell Terrier named Buddy, who escapes from the house during a thunderstorm and gets lost. While trying to find him, Andie befriends Tristan Saunders, a red-haired boy who has a long-lost cat named Lucy, and he helps her look. They also manage to find a lost Black Labrador, which belongs to fashion-conscious Natalie Lewis, and the three of them form The Pet Finders Club after Buddy is found. Together they track down many missing pets, and even missing owners. There is even a burglary at their local pet shop, Paws for Thought, which is owned by Tristan's mother's cousin, Christine Wilson.

List of books
Come Back, Buddy!
Max is Missing
Looking for Lola
Rescuing Raisin
The Dog With No Name
Searching for Sunshine
Disappearing Desert Kittens
Dachshund in Danger
Runaway Rascal
Help Honey

Animal Ark
In Animal Ark, Mandy Hope and her friend James Hunter help helpless and injured animals throughout the series, and sometimes she helps perished animals on a "mission". Her parents, Adam and Emily Hope, are vets in Animal Ark (the veterinary practice that gives the series its name), which comes in handy in helping the animals she comes across. Mandy has three rabbits, Flopsy, Mopsy, and Cottontail. She is definite that she will become a vet and help sick animals in need. Other characters are Simon, a fellow nurse, and Jean Knox, the receptionist. There is also a black Labrador named "Blackie" that belongs to Mandy's friend and behaves very manic, and also sometimes goes on the adventures. Mandy finds that many people are actually very fond of animals and have a heart of gold. When she isn't working with animals, she is helping her parents with their work.

Jess the Border Collie
In Jess the Border Collie, 11-year-old Jenny Miles lives on her family's farm, Windy Hill, which is a working sheep farm, with no room for pets. When one of her father's newborn puppies are born with a bad leg, it's up to Jenny to convince her dad that the puppy, whom she names Jess, is worth saving. Soon, Jess is making himself useful, helping Jenny, helping the farm, and helping the neighbours.

 The Arrival
 The Challenge
 The Runaway
 The Betrayal
 The Sacrifice
 The Homecoming
 The Discovery
 The Gift
 The Promise

Other books
Baglio has also contributed one title, The First Olympics, to the Choose Your Own Adventure gamebook series. Baglio also wrote the Horseshoe Trilogies and the Nine Lives Trilogy.

References

External links
Ben M. Baglio – biography on Scholastic.com
Ben M. Baglio – bibliography on Fantasticfiction.co.uk
 
 

1960 births
Living people
American children's writers
Choose Your Own Adventure writers
House names 
Writers from New York City 
Book packagers